The Macedonian Press Agency (MPA) was one of the two major news agencies in Greece, the other one being Athens News Agency, before they merged into the Athens News Agency-Macedonian Press Agency (ANA-MPA).

The Macedonian Press Agency offers political, cultural and economic news and information on events taking place in Greece, as well as around the world. Special emphasis is given on issues concerning the Balkans, Eastern Europe and the Black Sea region.

External links
 Official Web Site

News agencies based in Greece
1991 establishments in Greece
Government agencies of Greece